Chen Jiayu (born name Francisco Chen or simply Chico Chen; born 14 July 1993) is a Chinese footballer who currently plays for Heilongjiang Ice City on loan from Cova da Piedade.

Club career
Chen was born in Lisbon to father Chen Shichao, a professional table tennis player. Chen Shichao originates from Guangzhou, the People's Republic of China and emigrated to Portugal after he accepted the invitation of Portuguese table tennis club Sporting CP in 1989. Chen joined Pescadores's youth academy and was promoted to the first team in 2013. On 14 September 2013, he made his senior debut in a 2–2 away draw against União de Tomar, coming on as a substitute for Charles Oliveira in the 86th minute.

Chen joined Chinese holding club Mafra in 2014. He moved to Loures in the summer of 2015. He made his debut for the club on 23 August 2015 in a 0–0 home draw to 1º de Dezembro. After making 13 appearances in the 2015–16 season, he joined another Campeonato de Portugal team Tourizense in July 2016. He made his debut on 21 August 2016, playing the whole match in a 1–1 home draw against Mortágua.

On 18 August 2017, Chen transferred to LigaPro side Cova da Piedade. On 12 May 2018, he made his debut in LigaPro in a 3–2 win over União da Madeira.

Personal life
Chen's father Chen Shichao is currently the men's and women's table tennis team coach of Sporting CP. His younger brother Diogo Chen (Chen Jiahong) is a table tennis player for Sporting CP and Portugal. He renounced Portuguese nationality and acquired Chinese nationality in March 2016.

Career statistics

References

External links

1993 births
Living people
People from Lisbon
Chinese footballers
Portuguese footballers
Portuguese people of Chinese descent
GS Loures players
G.D. Tourizense players
C.D. Cova da Piedade players
Segunda Divisão players
Liga Portugal 2 players
Chinese expatriate footballers
Expatriate footballers in Portugal
Chinese expatriate sportspeople in Portugal
Association football defenders